Somianka  is a village in Wyszków County, Masovian Voivodeship, in east-central Poland. It is the seat of the gmina (administrative district) called Gmina Somianka.

The village has a population of 510.

References

Somianka